List of archaeological sites in County Antrim, Northern Ireland:

 

A
Aghalee, Church and graveyard, grid ref: J1275 6548
Aghalislone, Rath, grid ref: J2599 6792
Aghalislone, Barrow, grid ref: J2549 6825
Aldfreck, Enclosure with structure, grid ref: J4475 9607
Altagore, Cashel, grid ref: D2495 3488
Altilevelly, Motte: Dunisland Fort, grid ref: J3722 9729
Antrim Round Tower, Antrim, grid ref: J1544 8770
Antynanum, Court tomb, grid ref: D2556 1094
Ardclinis, Church and graveyard, grid ref: D2717 2499
Armoy Round Tower, Armoy, grid ref: D0778 3325
Aughnaholle, Barrow cemetery, grid ref: D2339 3822
Aughnahoy, Standing stone, grid ref: C9875 0245
Aughnamullan, Bivallate rath, grid ref: J1985 7713
Ault alias Gowkstown, Wedge tomb: Giant’s Grave, grid ref: D3161 1082

B
Ballinderry, Medieval church site, grid ref: J1168 6821
Ballinderry, Crannog, grid ref: J1143 6800
Ballinloughan, Ring barrow, grid ref: D2366 3877
Ballintoy Demesne, Cave and occupation site: Potters Cave or Park Cave, grid ref: D0293 4488
Balloo, Mound, grid ref: J1387 8674
Ballyaghagan, Round cairn, grid ref: J3233 7973
Ballyaghagan, Promontory fort: McArt’s Fort, grid ref: J3250 7959
Ballyaghagan, Cashel, grid ref: J3128 7936
Ballyaghagan, Kidney-shaped enclosure, grid ref: J3247 7960
Ballyalbanagh and Ballynashee, Hilltop round cairn, grid ref: J2778 9794
Ballyalbanagh, Court tomb, grid ref: J2874 9754
Ballyalbanagh, Rectangular enclosure and field system, grid ref: J2891 9673
Ballyboley, Court tomb: Carndoo or the Abbey, grid ref: J3284 9731
Ballybracken Barrow, grid ref: J2231 9341
Ballyclare Motte, grid ref: J2916 9123
Ballycleagh Standing Stones, grid ref: D2485 3339
Ballycowan Rath, rath and souterrain, grid ref: J1340 9927
Ballycraigy Mound, grid ref: J1710 8552
Ballyharry
Ballylumford Dolmen (aka Druid's Altar), Islandmagee, portal tomb, grid ref: D4304 0160
Ballynashee and Ballyalbanagh, Hilltop round cairn, grid ref: J2778 9794 
The Broad Stone, grid ref: C9793 1756; see Craigs Dolmen

C
Carndoo Court Tomb, (aka The Abbey Court Tomb), grid ref: J3284 9731 
Chi-Rho Stone, Kilraughts, Ballymoney
Craigs Dolmen, Rasharkin, passage grave, grid ref: C9740 1729

D
Dalways Bawn, Carrickfergus, grid ref: J4427 9141
Doagh Hole Stone, Doagh
Dooey's Cairn (aka Ballymacaldrack Court Tomb), Dunloy, court tomb, grid ref: D0215 1830
Drumnadrough Rath, grid ref: J3302 8117
Dunisland Fort, motte, grid ref: J3722 9729

G
Giants Ring, Belfast, henge and passage grave, grid ref: J3272 6770
Giant's Grave, wedge tomb, grid ref: D3161 1082

H
Harryville Motte, Ballymena, Motte-and-bailey, grid ref: D1122 0260

L
Lissanduff Fort, Antrim
Lissue Rath, grid ref: J2277 6325
Lough-Na-Crannagh, Fair Head, crannog
Lurigethan Fort, Glenariff

M
McArt's Fort, Promontory fort in Ballyaghagan townland, grid ref: J3250 7959
Moyadam, standing stone, grid ref: J2510 8831

O
Ossian's Grave (aka Cloghbrack), Cushendall, grid ref: D2128 2847

P
Potters Cave (aka Park Cave), cave and occupation site, grid ref: D0293 4488

S
Slaght Standing Stones, grid ref: D1473 3482

T
Tievebulliagh, Glens of Antrim, round cairn and Neolithic axe factory, grid ref: area of D193 266

References
The main reference for all sites listed is: NI Environment Agency, Scheduled Historic Monuments (to 15 October 2012), unless otherwise indicated.

 
Antrim
County Antrim
Archaeological